Conus granarius is a species of sea snail, a marine gastropod mollusk in the family Conidae, the cone snails, cone shells or cones.

These snails are predatory and venomous. They are capable of "stinging" humans.

Description
The size of the shell varies between 23 mm and 71 mm. The spire is concavely elevated and not coronated.  The body whorl is smooth and slightly striate below. It is irregularly marbled with chestnut and white, with equidistant chestnut revolving lines bearing white spots that are granularly elevated.

Distribution
This marine species of cone snail occurs in the Caribbean Sea from Panama to Venezuela; off the Caribbean islands Curaçao, Aruba and Bonaire.

References

 Petuch. 1990. Nautilus. 104 (2): 67, 26-27.
 Kiener L.C. 1844-1850. Spécies général et iconographie des coquilles vivantes. Vol. 2. Famille des Enroulées. Genre Cone (Conus, Lam.), pp. 1-379, pl. 1-111 [pp. 1-48 (1846); 49-160 (1847); 161-192 (1848); 193-240 (1849); 241-[379](assumed to be 1850); plates 4,6 (1844); 2-3, 5, 7-32, 34-36, 38, 40-50 (1845); 33, 37, 39, 51-52, 54-56, 57-68, 74-77 (1846); 1, 69-73, 78-103 (1847); 104-106 (1848); 107 (1849); 108-111 (1850)]. Paris, Rousseau & J.B. Baillière
 Puillandre N., Duda T.F., Meyer C., Olivera B.M. & Bouchet P. (2015). One, four or 100 genera? A new classification of the cone snails. Journal of Molluscan Studies. 81: 1-23

External links
 To World Register of Marine Species
 Cone Shells - Knights of the Sea
 

granarius
Gastropods described in 1847